John Jackson McSwain (May 1, 1875 – August 6, 1936) was a U.S. Representative from South Carolina.

Born on a farm near Cross Hill, South Carolina, McSwain attended the public schools. He graduated from Wofford College Fitting School in 1893 and from the University of South Carolina at Columbia in 1897. He taught school in Marlboro, Abbeville, and Anderson Counties. He studied law. He was admitted to the bar in 1901 and commenced practice in Greenville, South Carolina. He served as a referee in bankruptcy from 1912–1917. He entered the officers' training camp at Fort Oglethorpe, Georgia, May 12, 1917, and served in the First World War as captain of Company A, One Hundred and Fifty-fourth Infantry, until March 6, 1919, when he was honorably discharged. He resumed the practice of law in Greenville, South Carolina.

McSwain was elected as a Democrat to the Sixty-seventh and to the seven succeeding Congresses and served from March 4, 1921, until his death. He served as chairman of the Committee on Military Affairs (Seventy-second through Seventy-fourth Congresses). He declined to be a candidate for renomination in 1936. He died in Columbia, South Carolina, on August 6, 1936. He was interred in Springwood Cemetery, Greenville, South Carolina.

See also
 List of United States Congress members who died in office (1900–49)

Sources

References

External links
 

1875 births
Wofford College alumni
University of South Carolina alumni
1936 deaths
United States Army officers
Democratic Party members of the United States House of Representatives from South Carolina